Hiwalcha   is market center in Sharada Municipality in Salyan District in the Rapti Zone of western-central Nepal. The place formerly existing as Village Development Committee was annexed to form a new municipality since 18 May 2014. At the time of the 1991 Nepal census it had a population of 3533 people living in 658 individual households.

References

External links
UN map of the municipalities of Salyan District

Populated places in Salyan District, Nepal